State Route 125 (SR 125) is a  state highway in Coffee and Pike counties in the southeastern part of the U.S. state of Alabama. The southern terminus of the highway is at U.S. Route 84 (US 84) and SR 87 in Elba. The northern terminus of the route is at an intersection with US 231 south of Brundidge.

Route description

SR 125 begins at US 84/SR 87 (also unsigned SR 12) in Elba, northeast of the downtown area of the city. Heading northeast, SR 125 travels through Victoria and intersects SR 167. It continues to the northeast and then reaches its northern terminus, an intersection with US 231 (internally designated as SR 53) south of Brundidge.

Major intersections

See also

References

External links

125
Transportation in Coffee County, Alabama
Transportation in Pike County, Alabama